Natural History Unit may refer to:

 The BBC Natural History Unit
 The former ABC Natural History Unit